Michel Guimond (December 26, 1953 – January 19, 2015) was a Canadian politician. From 1987 to 1993 he served as a city councillor in Boischatel, Quebec. After this, he ran in the 1993 federal election for the Bloc Québécois. He was elected into the House of Commons of Canada as the member from Beauport—Montmorency—Orléans. He was re-elected in the 1997 and 2000 federal elections (in the riding of Beauport—Montmorency—Côte-de-Beaupré—Île-d'Orléans) and in the 2004 federal election (in the riding of Charlevoix—Montmorency). In the 2004 and 2008 elections, he won in Montmorency—Charlevoix—Haute-Côte-Nord before being defeated in the 2011 federal election. A lawyer, he has served as the Bloc critic of Parliamentary Affairs, Transport and to the Auditor General. He then served as whip and deputy whip of the Bloc Québécois, and was also the vice-chair of the Standing Committee on Procedure and House Affairs.

In the 2014 provincial election, he ran unsuccessfully for the Parti Québécois to represent the riding of Montmorency.

Guimond died of heart failure on January 19, 2015.

Electoral record

Montmorency

Montmorency—Charlevoix—Haute-Côte-Nord

Source: Elections Canada

Charlevoix—Montmorency, 2004

1997 and 2000 federal elections

References

External links
 Parliament Webpage 
 

1953 births
2015 deaths
Bloc Québécois MPs
French Quebecers
Members of the House of Commons of Canada from Quebec
21st-century Canadian politicians
Université Laval alumni